Zulfikar Joy Ali (22 December 1978 – 5 January 2015) was a Fijian boxer. He had won 31 boxing matches in his career.

Boxing career
In 1995, Ali's first reported boxing match was against Raven, whom he defeated in the fourth round by a KO at the National Indoor Stadium, Suva, Fiji. He won the vacant Pan Asian Boxing Association (PABA) light middleweight title against the former World Amateur bronze medalist Ercüment Aslan of Turkey.

Personal life
Ali was a very religious person and followed the Islamic faith. He sold razor blades with his younger brother to start off his boxing career. Ali died on 5 January 2015, aged 36, at the CWM Hospital in Suva. His death was a suicide. Ali is survived by his wife and three children.

References

External links
 

1978 births
2015 deaths
Fijian Muslims
Fijian male boxers
Sportspeople from Nadi
Middleweight boxers
2015 suicides